Thelymitra purpurata, commonly called the wallum sun orchid, is a species of orchid that is endemic to eastern Australia. It has up to ten purplish flowers with long, finger-like glands on the top of the column and flowers earlier in the season than most other thelymitras.

Description
The lobe on the top of the anther is short, yellow with a dark blue band and with many finger-like calli. The side lobes have dense, mop-like tufts of white hairs. The flowers are insect-pollinated, open on sunny days and often have the petals and sepals turned backwards. Flowering occurs from July to September.

Taxonomy and naming
Thelymitra purpurata was first formally described in 1945 by Herman Rupp from a specimen collected in Brunswick Heads by Fred Fordham and the description was published in Proceedings of the Linnean Society of New South Wales. The specific epithet (purpurata) is a Latin word meaning "purple".

Distribution and habitat
The wallum sun orchid is common in heath in coastal Queensland south of Fraser Island to Myall Lakes in New South Wales.

References

External links
 
 

purpurata
Endemic orchids of Australia
Orchids of New South Wales
Orchids of Queensland
Plants described in 1945
Taxa named by Herman Rupp